Ahlmann is a surname. Notable people with the surname include:

Christian Ahlmann (born 1974), German equestrian
Hans Wilhelmsson Ahlmann (1889–1974), Swedish geographer, glaciologist, and diplomat
Lis Ahlmann (1894–1979), Danish weaver and textile designer
Vilhelm Ahlmann (1852–1928), Danish-Swedish architect
Viktor Ahlmann (born 1995), Danish football player

See also
Else Ahlmann-Ohlsen (1907–1994), Danish fencer
Ahlmann Glacier, a glacier of Antarctica
Ahlmann Ridge, a ridge of Antarctica